Clemensia mucida is a moth of the family Erebidae. It is found in Costa Rica.

References

Cisthenina
Moths described in 1911